Safiya Nygaard (born July 16, 1992) is  an American YouTuber. She gained prominence through her work with BuzzFeed, creating the series LadyLike. Her video explaining why she left the network went viral. She is now known for her solo YouTube channel, containing content such as her Bad Makeup Science series.

Early life 
Nygaard was born in Santa Clara, California to a Danish father Niels Nygaard, who is a math professor by profession and an Indian mother Mumtaz. She has an younger brother named Adil Nygaard. She was raised in Chicago where she attended Whitney M. Young Magnet High School until 2010. Upon graduating from high school, she entered Stanford University where she completed a Bachelor of Arts degree in Drama and English.

Career 
Nygaard was hired by BuzzFeed in April 2015 and worked as a video producer for BuzzFeed's show Ladylike. She left BuzzFeed in January 2017. Nygaard explained her reasoning for leaving the company in her popular 2017 video titled "Why I Left BuzzFeed". "Why I Left BuzzFeed" has over 14.9 million views.

Nygaard appeared on the 2018 season of Escape the Night. She is known for her YouTube series "Bad Beauty Science" in which she has mixed together all of her liquid lipsticks, foundations, eye shadows and highlighters to create "Franken" products. Nygaard is often credited with starting a YouTube trend of mixing large quantities of a single type of beauty product together. She has also made several fashion related videos including wearing strange or novelty clothing items such as clear pants, 9-foot long jeans, and thigh-high Ugg boots.

In October 2019, Nygaard released a lipstick collection in collaboration with ColourPop. In 2022, Nygaard signed with the management company, Night.

Personal life 
Nygaard is married to YouTube collaborator Tyler Williams. Several YouTubers, including Jenna Mourey (Jenna Marbles), Shane Dawson, and Cristine Rotenberg (Simply Nailogical), attended Nygaard and Williams' 2019 wedding.

In 2015, Nygaard and Williams adopted a street cat and named him Crusty. He ended up becoming a prominent part of Safiya's channel. Crusty died in late 2021 due to old age. Nygaard uploaded a YouTube video as a tribute to Crusty on April 2, 2022.

In 2021, Nygaard and Williams sold their house in Studio City, Los Angeles, which they originally purchased in 2019. It was bought by actress Uzo Aduba for $3.1 million, turning a $200k profit in under two years of ownership. Nygaard and Williams temporarily moved to Philadelphia from Los Angeles in early 2021 before permanently relocating to Raleigh, North Carolina that February.

Safiya was born a dual national of the United States and Denmark. However, she subsequently lost her Danish nationality due to the 22-year rule.

Filmography

Television

Awards

References 

1992 births
Living people
American YouTubers
Beauty and makeup YouTubers
BuzzFeed people
English-language YouTube channels
Entertainers from California
Entertainers from Illinois
Fashion YouTubers
People from Chicago
People from Santa Clara, California
Women video bloggers
YouTube channels launched in 2016
American people of Danish descent
American people of Indian descent